Karpal Singh Drive is a seafront promenade within the suburb of Jelutong near George Town in Penang, Malaysia. It is named after Karpal Singh (1940-2014), a prominent opposition politician and lawyer who hailed from George Town.

Along Karpal Singh Drive are upscale residential and commercial properties, while the paved promenade itself is decorated with a handful of art sculptures. The promenade faces east, lying along the South Channel of the Penang Strait.

Etymology 
The promenade was renamed after the late Karpal Singh, a Penangite lawyer who became one of the top Democratic Action Party (DAP) politicians. He was once nicknamed the 'Tiger of Jelutong' as he held the federal constituency of Jelutong for five consecutive terms. At the time of death in 2014, he was the Member of Parliament for the Bukit Gelugor federal constituency south of Jelutong.

After Karpal Singh's death, the Chief Minister of Penang, Lim Guan Eng, announced that the seaside promenade would be renamed in honour of his departed colleague and presented a map of the road with its new name to Karpal's widow, Gurmit Kaur. The renaming of the promenade made Karpal Singh the first local DAP politician to be honoured with a street name within Penang Island.

Prior to the renaming move, the road was known colloquially as the Seaview' or the IJM Promenade, the latter after the firm that developed this particular neighbourhood.

Landmarks
Karpal Singh Drive features a 10 metre paved walkway beautified with modern art sculptures by Hitori Nakayama, a Japanese artist who has been residing in Penang. These include the 'Celebration of Our Blue Sky' and the '''Rhythm of Light'; the former consists of a set of four blue pillars whilst the latter depicts musical notes.

The Maritime is a commercial complex at Karpal Singh Drive, consisting of a two-storey commercial podium known as The Maritime Piazza and two high rise office blocks called The Maritime Suites. The Maritime Piazza contains the Auto Mall, which is made up of car showrooms, eateries, cafes, spas, and entertainment outlets. 

Past art exhibitions

Penang Flotilla
The Penang Flotilla, which became the overall champion in the 2014 1Malaysia International Tourism Night Floral Parade, was installed at Karpal Singh Drive for public display until the end of 2015.

Ubah Bird
The Ubah di Air''' bird mascot was launched at the Karpal Singh Drive. It became the mascot for the DAP during 2013 Malaysian general election.

Gallery

References

Roads in Penang
George Town, Penang
Waterfronts